The Ruf RTR is a sports car produced by Ruf Automobile of Germany. Introduced in 2013 on the 40th anniversary of the Ruf Turbo, the RTR is based on the 991 generation Porsche 911 and pays homage to the original Ruf Turbo.

Model Information 
Customers had a choice to either order their car in "narrow body" configuration or with a Ruf designed "wide body" configuration with hand-crafted, widened fenders which add 410 mm (3.15 in) of width at the front and 390 mm (4.73 in) at the rear. In addition to the optional wide body configuration, the exterior features a large rear wing, a redesigned front bumper and special Ruf 5-spoke alloy wheels. It also has an integrated roll cage (IRC); a common feature on Ruf models, and ceramic disc brakes that measure 16.1 inches at the front and 15.4 inches at the rear. 10 RTRs were reportedly built, and, according to Ruf, the RTR is no longer in production. However, it is unknown when production ended.

Performance 
The RTR was offered with a 3.8-litre (3,746 cc) twin-turbocharged flat-six engine available in two variants. The first variant, based on the A91 engine found in the 991 911 Turbo and Turbo S, produces  and was available with a choice of a 6-speed manual transmission or a 7-speed PDK. Also offered for both variants is the choice of rear-wheel drive or all-wheel drive drivetrains.

References 
Ruf vehicles
Cars introduced in 2013
Cars powered by boxer engines

Rear-engined vehicles